Tow Truck Pluck is a 2004 Dutch family film, based on Pluk van de Petteflet, a book by Annie M.G. Schmidt.

The film received a Golden Film (100,000 visitors) in 2004 and a Platinum Film (400,000 visitors) in 2005.

Cast
Janieck van de Polder - Pluck
Suzanne Zuiderwijk - Aggie
Arjan Ederveen - Mr Penn & Hermite
Jack Wouterse - Father Stamper
Erik van Muiswinkel - Major
Paul Hoes - Park architect
Erica Terpstra - Mayor
Stefan de Walle - Doctor
Hanneke Riemer - Ms. Brightner
Martine Sandifort - Dolly (voice)
John Buijsman - Charlie (voice)
Owen Schumacher - Zaza (voice)
Frits Lambrechts - Tell-me-where-wolf (voice)
Karin Bloemen - Horse Longhors (voice)
Dolf Jansen - Rabbit (voice)
Marc-Marie Huijbregts - Tootlispe (voice)

External links

2004 films
2000s Dutch-language films
2004 comedy films
Films based on works by Annie M.G. Schmidt
Films directed by Ben Sombogaart
Dutch comedy films